The Elections (Fraudulent Conveyances) Act 1711 (10 Ann c 31), sometimes called the Elections (Fraudulent Conveyance) Act 1711, was an Act of the Parliament of Great Britain.

This Act is chapter 23 in Ruffhead's Edition.

The Elections (Fraudulent Conveyances) Act 1711, except for section 1, was repealed by section 1 of, and the Schedule to, the Statute Law Revision Act 1867.

The whole Act, so far as unrepealed, was repealed by section 47(1) of, and Schedule 8 to, the Representation of the People Act 1918.

References

Great Britain Acts of Parliament 1711